Scythropopsis albitarsis is a species of beetle in the family Cerambycidae. It was described by Laporte in 1840.

References

Acanthoderini
Beetles described in 1840